Ramai Ram (1 January 1944 – 14 July 2022) was an Indian politician from VIP and was nine times MLA from Bochahan constituency in Bihar.

Personal life 
Ramai Ram was born to Kisuni Ram at Muzaffarpur, Bihar into a Dalit family.

His daughter, Geeta Kumari was appointed a member of the State Transport Authority when he was Transport Minister and later she became MLC from Bihar. His other daughter, Rekha Devi was also MLC in Bihar.

He died at Medanta Hospital in Kankarbagh, Patna on 14 July 2022 at the age of 78.

Politics 
Ramai Ram once used to be known as right-hand of Lalu Prasad Yadav.

 In 1972 he won for the first time from Bochahan constituency as an independent candidate. He joined Janata Party in 1980 and won from same seat.
 He again won Bochahan constituency in 1985 from Lok Dal and in 1990 & 1995 from Janata Dal.
 In 2000 he joined RJD and won from Bochahan and again in 2005. He became president of Bihar Rashtriya Janata Dal when Lalu Yadav was in jail.
 He left RJD and joined JDU in 2009 along with his daughter, Geeta Kumari. In 2010 he was again elected from Bochahan constituency.
 He was Bihar Land Reforms and Revenue Minister in Rabri Devi's government from 1999 to 2005 and in first Nitish Kumar govt.
 In 2009 he joined Congress and fought Indian general elections from Gopalganj Lok Sabha constituency.
 He was Transport Minister in Jitan Ram Manjhi's government and became President of Bihar Janata Dal (U) in 2017.
 Ram left JDU and was made state president of Loktantrik Janata Dal. Later he re-joined RJD in 2017.
 He was member of national executive team of RJD

Controversies 

 He was criticized for appointing his daughter a non-official as member of State Transport Authority.
 He was reported under Human Rights Commission for harassing his domestic help.
 In 2012 he was attacked by a councillor of Muzaffarpur for unknown reasons. 
 He was suspended from JDU under Sharad Yadav along with 21 other leaders for doing anti-party.
 He demanded separate country, Harijanistan (land for Dalits) after loss of Dalit lives in April 2018 caste protests in India.

References 

1944 births
2022 deaths
Bihari politicians
Rashtriya Janata Dal politicians
Janata Dal (United) politicians
Indian National Congress politicians
Lok Dal politicians
Janata Party politicians
Loktantrik Janata Dal politicians
Dalit politicians
People from Muzaffarpur district